Odiaone Entertainment is an entertainment digital channel of Odisha. It also does film production of regional language of Odisha. It was founded by Samaresh Routray in 2012.

History
Odiaone Entertainment is the first digital channel in Odisha which was founded  in 2012 by Samaresh Routray.

Filmography

Films Under Music Label of Odiaone 

 Katak
 Hey Sakha
 Luchakali
 Mun
 Love Master
 Rumku Jhumana
 Rudra
 Sapanara Naika
 Hari Om Hari
 Mu Diwana To pain
 Omm Sai Tujhe Salam
 Alar
 Tanka Tate Salam
 Kaunri kanya
 Gaddabadd
 Sandehi Priyatama
 Tu Aau Mun
 Khas Tumari Pain
 Sahitya Didi
 Omm
 Sangam
 Aame Ta Toka Sandha Marka
 My First Love
 Oolala Oolala
 Rockstar

Films under Digital Channel of Odiaone
 Suna Chadei
 Suna Palinki
 Hasila Sansar Bhangila Kia
 Kotea Re Gotea
 Dhauli Express
 Lal Tuk Tuk Sadhaba Bohu
 Rasika Nagar
 Tumaku Paruni Ta Bhuli
 Dhire Dhire Prema Hela
 Tu Mo Girl Friend
 Hero
 Kemiti Ea Bandhan
 Kebe Tume Nahan Kebe Mu Nahin
 Chanda Na Tume Tara
 Dharma
 Chowka Chhaka
 Aasha
 Sunya Swaroop
 Bhul Bujibani Mate

References

Companies based in Bhubaneswar
2012 establishments in Odisha